Tasik is a village in the Sisian Municipality of the Syunik Province in Armenia.

Etymology 
The village has previously been known as Tazagyukh, Gushch’i, T’azak’end, Kushch’i, Kushch’i-T’azak’end and Ghushch’i.

Demographics 
The Statistical Committee of Armenia reported its population as 291 in 2010, up from 274 at the 2001 census.

References 

Populated places in Syunik Province